Fanconi anemia, complementation group E protein is a protein that in humans is encoded by the FANCE gene. The Fanconi anemia complementation group (FANC) currently includes FANCA, FANCB, FANCC, FANCD1 (also called BRCA2), FANCD2, FANCE, FANCF, FANCG, and FANCL. Fanconi anemia is a genetically heterogeneous recessive disorder characterized by cytogenetic instability, hypersensitivity to DNA cross-linking agents, increased chromosomal breakage, and defective DNA repair. The members of the Fanconi anemia complementation group do not share sequence similarity; they are related by their assembly into a common nuclear protein complex. This gene encodes the protein for complementation groufcrp E.

A nuclear complex containing FANCE protein (as well as FANCC, FANCF and FANCG) is essential for the activation of the FANCD2 protein to the mono-ubiquitinated isoform.  In normal, non-mutant cells, FANCD2 is mono-ubiquinated in response to DNA damage. FANCE together with FANCC acts as the substrate adapter for this reaction   Activated FANCD2 protein co-localizes with BRCA1 (breast cancer susceptibility protein) at ionizing radiation-induced foci and in synaptonemal complexes of meiotic chromosomes. Activated FANCD2 protein may function prior to the initiation of meiotic recombination, perhaps to prepare chromosomes for synapses, or to regulate subsequent recombination events.

Gene Expression 
FANCE is stated to have been expressed in 151 organs with the highest level in female gonads.

Chromosomal Location 
The location of the gene is in 6p21.31, where p is the short arm of chromosome 6 at position 21.31

The location at molecular level is in base pairs 35,452,339 to 35,467,106 on chromosome 6 (Homo sapiens Annotation Release 109, GRCh38.p12)

Protein Characteristics 
The main complex of FA contains a nuclear multi-subunit complex of notably 8 FA proteins. This adds a single ubiquiting chain to the FANCD2 following DNA damage or duplicative pressure.

For the collection of FANCC, FANCE is important in the nucleus and gathering of the core complex. Some characteristics of FANCE is that it can set itself with ubiquitinated FANCD2, BRCA2 and constructed nuclear foci. Also, as it is the only member showing direct union with FANCD2 and gives the needed links between FA core complex and FANCD2. 

The structure of FANCE has an epitope on its surface that is found to be important for its binding with FANCD2. The existence of recurrent helical motif was not clear when analysis of amino acids were done.

Protein Structure 
It consists of 13 α-helices, 1 310-helix and no β-strand. Long shaped, non-globular shape and 70 Å n size. Width of 30 Å and thickness 20 Å. The protein folds continuously in right-handed manner from N- to C- terminal. Identifying it is easy because of its helices at the end of C-end.

Function 
It restores DNA cross-links and is needed for nuclear accumulation of FANCC, delivering a critical bridge between FA complex and FANCD2.  

FANCE-deficient mice exhibit a reduced number of oocytes and disruption of prophase I of meiosis indicating that FANCE has an essential role in meiosis.

Applications 

 FANCE has its application in Western Blot and IHC-P (Immunohistochemistry) where the predicted molecular weight was 58 kDa in Western blot and antigen recovery with citrate buffer pH6 was done before the onset of IHC-P.

 FANCE is also used in Gene Mapping, here homozygosity mapping, where it is fused with 3 DNA cells that will help in calculating the sensitivity to composites of Mitomycin C, a DNA cross-linking agent (Sigma). It also then examines the use of micro satellite markers D6S422 and D6S1610, for linking. From this, a chromosomal region on chromosome 6p is located for FANCE. 
Immunoblotting showed that FANCE-L348M and FANCE-E263K mutants showed a division in the nuclear membrane of FA-E EUFA409 LCL indicating that irrespective of FANCE having putative nuclear localization signals, it limits primarily to the nucleus.

Interactions 

FANCE has been shown to interact with: 
 FANCA,
 FANCD2, 
 FANCF 
 FANCG, and
 FANCC.

References

Further reading

External links